Canter's Deli is a Jewish-style delicatessen, opened in 1931 in Boyle Heights, and later moved to the Fairfax District of Los Angeles, California, near the border of West Hollywood, where it is now. It has been frequented by many notable movie stars and celebrities.

The restaurant has continued to serve traditional food items, including: lox and bagels, corned beef, matzoh ball soup, and challah bread. However, it is not certified kosher, being open on Saturdays and offering many non-kosher menu items (e.g., ham sandwiches).
Canter's has remained open 24 hours most days, except on the Jewish holidays of Rosh Hashanah and Yom Kippur.  However, its dining room is now only open until 11:30 PM.

In 2021, the Financial Times ranked it as one of the "50 greatest food stores in the world."

History 
The Canter family originally opened a delicatessen in Jersey City, New Jersey, in 1924.  They came west along with many Jews from the northeastern United States,
and in 1931 they opened a delicatessen on Brooklyn Avenue in the Boyle Heights neighborhood, which at that time had a substantial Jewish population. After World War II, the Jewish population of Boyle Heights left en masse for the Fairfax District, West Hollywood, and other West Side neighborhoods (as well as the San Fernando Valley) and Canter's followed the influx of Jewish businesses west.  A location at 439 North Fairfax Avenue opened in 1948; in 1953, the restaurant moved up the block into the former Esquire Theater (which had previously shown Yiddish-language films), resulting in a delicatessen much larger than its previous spaces.  The restaurant was further expanded in 1959, and the Kibitz Room cocktail lounge opened in 1961.  The Boyle Heights location remained in business until the 1970s.

Canter's quickly became a hang-out for show business personalities, given its location and its 24/7 hours. It has remained such ever since. In the 1960s, Canter's became a late night hang-out for hippies,
rock musicians, and other countercultural types, partially for the same reasons. Also, many rock musicians had grown up in Fairfax and West Hollywood, and the Sunset Strip was only a half-mile (0.8 km) away. Canter's has remained a favorite of rock musicians to the present day, and its bakery and deli counter are still open 24 hours.  Canter's is open every day except for the Jewish holidays of Rosh Hashanah and Yom Kippur.

Canter's is known for its traditional deli favorites, such as pastrami, corned beef, matzah ball soup, challah, lox and bagels, and brisket.  It also has a large menu of other breakfast, lunch, and dinner options and has been awarded for its food many times over the years.  For example, Los Angeles Magazine named Canter's waffles the Best Waffle in Los Angeles. Esquire magazine called their Monte Cristo sandwich one of the best sandwiches in America.

The bar in Canter's, called the Kibitz Room, has its own history and has been a favorite of music personalities. Chuck E. Weiss. a regular at Canter's who has his name on a plaque at the booth where he would sit, wrote a song about the Kibitz Room called, "Rocking in the Kibitz Room." 
Although the restaurant is open 24 hours, the Kibitz Room closes at 2 am. They have live music every night, and were the launch pad for several bands, most notably the Wallflowers, Fiona Apple, and Rick Rubin's new project, the Vacation. The Big Jam has had plenty of "A List" musicians sit in, including Phil Everly, Jackson Browne, Melissa Etheridge, and Marc Canter's high school friend Slash.  Marc Canter, currently the restaurant's co-owner, published a book in 2007 about the early days of Guns N' Roses. In 2019, Gina Canter and Alex Canter released a book titled Stories on Rye, cataloging a collection of memories shared at Canter's.

The restaurant has been featured in several movies and television shows, including HBO's Curb Your Enthusiasm in the episode "The Blind Date" (2004) and AMC's Mad Men in the episode "Time Zones" (2014). In 2007, Adam Stein, finalist on the FOX TV show On the Lot, filmed "Dough: The Musical" at Canter's. Canter's is also mentioned in the song, "Oh Daddy," by The Turtles.

In 1993, the restaurant was featured in Visiting... with Huell Howser Episode 125.

In 2003, Canter's opened an additional location inside Treasure Island Hotel and Casino in Las Vegas. It closed in December 2012. Another location has been announced for The Linq Promenade.

On 14 October 2008, Canter's celebrated their 60th anniversary. To mark the occasion, the deli reduced the price of their corned beef sandwich to its 1948 price of 60 cents, limited to one per customer, for a period of 12 hours.

In 2008, Canter's had opened another deli outlet at Dodger Stadium. The operation at the baseball park closed in 2011 and was replaced by Dodgertown Deli.

On July 24, 2014, President Barack Obama surprised the lunchtime diners and staff when he visited Canter's.

In 2017, Canter's Deli announced it would open a location along the Las Vegas strip.

On August 7, 2017, Canter's Restaurant was ordered closed for three days by the Los Angeles County Health Department for eleven health code violations, including a vermin infestation. Among other things, inspectors observed more than 10 cockroaches and 20 rodent droppings in the restaurant storage area, and 20 flies in the food preparation area. The additional health code violations cited that food contact surfaces were not clean and sanitized and the food was not in a safe, healthy condition.

Canter's has now closed all locations in Las Vegas. After returning to the Las Vegas market in 2017, the first location closed at Tivoli Village in July 2018 and the second location closed at the Linq Promenade the second week of March, 2019.

On May 30, 2020, at the start of the George Floyd Protests, Canter's neighborhood was the site of one of the first intense confrontations between protestors and police in Los Angeles. Canter's posted messages in support of Black Lives Matter and stayed open during the protests, giving out food and water to demonstrators.

Popularity
In 2006, Canter's was serving:
 of pastrami per month
 of chicken soup per week
4,000 knishes per week.

See also

 List of Ashkenazi Jewish restaurants
 List of delicatessens
Diamond Bakery

References

External links
Canter's website

1924 establishments in California
Ashkenazi Jewish culture in Los Angeles
Ashkenazi Jewish restaurants
Fairfax, Los Angeles
Jewish-American history in California
Jewish delicatessens in the United States
Kosher style restaurants
Landmarks in Los Angeles
Restaurants established in 1924
Restaurants in Los Angeles